Pavlovia is an extinct genus of ammonite of the Late Jurassic to Late Cretaceous (age range: 150.8 to 99.7 Ma).

Species
Pavlovia menneri † Michailov 1957
Pavlovia pavlovi †  Michalsky 1890

Description
They are distinctively-ribbed, with windings that do not overlap largely each other. The suture lines are complicated and securely fastened to the shell wall.

Distribution
Fossils of these ammonites have been found  in Tithonian-aged marine strata of Late Jurassic Russia, and in Cretaceous-aged marine-strata of Great Britain.

References

Notes

Bibliography
 Fossielen: Sesam Natuur Handboeken, (Bosch & Keuning, Baarn). Cyril Walker & David Ward (1993) - 
 Fossils (Smithsonian Handbooks) by David Ward
 Cephalopods Present and Past: New Insights and Fresh Perspectives by Neil H. Landman, Richard Arnold Davis, and Royal H. Mapes
 Ammonoid Paleobiology (Topics in Geobiology) by Neil H. Landman, Kazushige Tanabe, and Richard Arnold Davis
 Guide to Fossils (Firefly Pocket series) by Firefly Books
 Cambridge Guide to Minerals Rocks and Fossils by A. C. Bishop

Late Jurassic ammonites
Late Jurassic ammonites of Europe
Jurassic England
Invertebrates of Russia
Molluscs of Europe
Perisphinctoidea
Ammonitida genera